Omicron Puppis (ο Puppis) is candidate binary star system in the southern constellation of Puppis. It is visible to the naked eye, having a combined apparent visual magnitude of +4.48. Based upon an annual parallax shift of 2.30 mas as seen from Earth, it is located roughly 1,400 light years from the Sun.

This is a suspected close spectroscopic binary system. The spectrum varies with a periodicity of 28.9 days, and a helium emission component shows a radial velocity variation that matches the period. The properties indicate it may be a φ Per-like system with a Be star primary and a hot subdwarf companion of type sdO. If this is the case, then the pair have a circular orbit with a period that matches the variability. The close-orbiting pair may have undergone interaction in the past, leaving the subdwarf stripped down and the primary star spinning rapidly.

ο Puppis is slightly variable. The General Catalogue of Variable Stars lists it as a possible Be star with a magnitude range of 4.43 - 4.46. The International Variable Star Index classifies it as a Lambda Eridani variable.

Naming
The correct Bayer designation for ο Puppis has been debated. Lacaille assigned one Greek letter sequence for the bright stars of Argo Navis. These Lacaille designations are now shared across the three modern constellations of Carina, Puppis, and Vela so that the same Greek letter is not usually found in more than one of the three. However, ο (omicron) is commonly used for stars in both Puppis and Vela. Some authors contend that Lacaille actually assigned a Latin lower case 'o' to this star, while others suggest that ο Velorum should actually be a lower case 'o'. In the Coelum Australe Stelliferum itself, this star is labelled (Latin) o Argus in puppi (Pouppe du Navire in the French edition), while ο Velorum is labelled ο (omicron) Argus (du Navire in the French edition).

References

B-type subgiants
Lambda Eridani variables
Be stars
Puppis, Omicron
Puppis
Durchmusterung objects
063462
038070
3045